Tmesisternus fuscosignatus is a species of beetle in the family Cerambycidae. It was described by Stephan von Breuning 1945. It is known from Papua New Guinea.

References

fuscosignatus
Beetles described in 1945